Zheng Cui is a biochemist currently serving as an Associate Professor of Pathology (Tumor Biology) at Wake Forest University. As an oncologist and a  cancer researcher Cui has proposed the unique idea that certain individuals (estimated at 10% to 15% of the human population) naturally produce a special kind of white blood cell that contains an inherent resistance to cancer.  This idea is extremely controversial within the cancer biology community.  These white blood cells, in Cui's view, could potentially be extracted from donors and given to cancer victims, thus endowing them with cancer resistance. Cui's research seems to indicate that the resistance includes many types of cancer.  Cui's research is based on experiments on mice. These experiments resulted in Cui being able to cure cancer in several otherwise terminally sick mice. Cui is proposing eventual experimentation of the technique on human subjects.

In 2003 Cui published his discovery of mice possessing a powerful innate immune system which rendered them resistant to cancer, and able to cause regression of cancer. These mice were designated SR/CR (Spontaneous Regression/Cancer Resistant).  Cui was unable to create or understand the mechanism of creation of the SR/CR mice. Cui subsequently published a number of other papers demonstrating the capabilities of SR/CR mice, the last one published in 2010. The following year he published a study showing that the leukocytes of humans possess varying degrees of "cancer killing activity".

External links
Speculist radio interview
Discover Magazine article on Cui
Report of Cui's Cancer Research
Cui's page at Wake Forest University and 
Cui's page with research summary at Wake Forest University
A medical article about transfer of anticancer innate immunity
SENS3 Lecture by Dr. Cui
Wake Forest Interview
Clinical trial site

References

Cui, Zheng
Cui, Zheng
Cui, Zheng (remission via blood transfusion)
Year of birth missing (living people)